Israel Olorunfeh Cole (March 20, 1944 – October 13, 2007)  better known by his stage name Dr. Oloh was a Sierra Leonean afropop and Jazz musician. Dr Oloh is widely considered one of the biggest  musicians from Sierra Leone. His hit singles were very popular  in  Sierra Leone in the 1970s, 1980s and early  1990s.

Early life and career 
Israel Olorunfeh Cole, commonly known as Dr. Oloh was born on March 20, 1944, in the mountain village of Leicester, near Freetown in the Western Area of Sierra Leone to a Nigerian mother and a Creole father. He led a band known as Milo Jazz. He was awarded the OR (Order of Rokel) by the  Sierra Leonean Government in 1989. Oloh and his band toured the United Kingdom a couple of times.

He died on October 13, 2007, after a short illness.

References 

Sierra Leone Creole people
1944 births
2007 deaths
Sierra Leonean musicians
People from Western Area Rural District